11714 Mikebrown, provisional designation , is a stony background asteroid from the central region of the asteroid belt, approximately  in diameter. It was discovered on 28 April 1998, by astronomers of the Lowell Observatory Near-Earth Object Search (LONEOS) at the U.S. Anderson Mesa Station near Flagstaff, Arizona, and later named after American astronomer Michael Brown.

Orbit and classification 

Mikebrown is a non-family asteroid from the main belt's background population. It orbits the Sun in the central main-belt at a distance of 2.0–3.4 AU once every 4 years and 4 months (1,596 days). Its orbit has an eccentricity of 0.26 and an inclination of 3° with respect to the ecliptic.

On 15 May 2012, Mikebrown came within about 14.8 Gm (0.099 AU) of asteroid 625 Xenia.

It was first observed as  Palomar Observatory in 1977, extending the body's observation arc by 21 years prior to its official discovery observation at Anderson Mesa.

Naming 

This minor planet was named after American astronomer Michael E. Brown (born 1965), a professor of astronomy at Caltech in California, and best known for his discoveries of trans-Neptunian objects, in particular the dwarf planet 136199 Eris. The official naming citation was published on 24 July 2002.

Physical characteristics 

According to the survey carried out by NASA's Wide-field Infrared Survey Explorer with its subsequent NEOWISE mission, Mikebrown measures 4.451 kilometers in diameter and its surface has an albedo of 0.246, which is typical for stony S-type asteroids.

It has an absolute magnitude of 14.1. As of 2017, no rotational lightcurve of Mikebrown has been obtained from photometric observations, and the body's rotation period and shape remains unknown.

References

External links 
 Asteroid Lightcurve Database (LCDB), query form (info )
 Dictionary of Minor Planet Names, Google books
 Asteroids and comets rotation curves, CdR – Observatoire de Genève, Raoul Behrend
 Discovery Circumstances: Numbered Minor Planets (10001)-(15000) – Minor Planet Center
 
 

011714
011714
Named minor planets
11714 Mikebrown
19980428